Fiqri Azwan bin Abdul Ghazali (born 20 March 1992 in Seremban, Negeri Sembilan) is a Malaysian footballer currently playing for Felcra FC in the Malaysia FAM League.

Honours
Melaka United
 Malaysia Premier League:2016

External links
 

1992 births
Living people
Malaysian footballers
People from Negeri Sembilan
Melaka United F.C. players
Negeri Sembilan FA players
Malaysian people of Malay descent
Association football fullbacks